The kalabans (Bangana dero) is a species of cyprinid fish found in streams in the Himalayan foothills in India, Nepal, and China. It is also found in Bangladesh.

References

Bangana
Fish described in 1822